Sheehan (also spelt Sheahan) is the Anglicisation of the Irish Gaelic surname Ó Síodhacháin, meaning the peaceful one. It is most common in counties Cork, Kerry and Limerick. It is the 77th most common surname in Ireland. This famous surname is of Dalcassian origin.

Notable people with the surname include:

Billy Sheehan (born 1953), American rock bassist
Bobby Sheehan (musician) (1968–1999), American rock bassist
Cindy Sheehan (born 1957), American anti-war politician and activist
D. D. (Daniel Desmond) Sheehan (1873–1948), Irish politician, journalist, and labour leader
David Sheehan (1938–2020), American television personality
Edward Sheehan (1930–2008), American journalist, diplomat and novelist
Erin Sheehan (politician), American politician
Fran Sheehan (born 1949), American rock bassist
Frank Sheehan (1933–2013), Canadian politician
Gary Sheehan (born 1964), Canadian-Swiss ice hockey coach
Harold Leeming Sheehan (1900–1988), British endocrinologist, for whom Sheehan's syndrome was named circa 1937
Helena Sheehan, American-born Irish academic and former nun
James J. Sheehan (born 1937), American historian
Jim Sheehan (1889–1967), Australian politician
John Sheehan (disambiguation), various
Mark Sheehan (born 1976), guitarist for The Script
Michael Sheehan (disambiguation), several people
Neil Sheehan (born 1936), Pulitzer Prize-winning American journalist, husband of Susan Sheehan
Paul Sheehan (disambiguation), several people, including:
Paul Sheehan (golfer) (born 1977), Australian professional golfer
Paul Sheehan (journalist) (born 1951), Australian journalist
Patrick Augustine Sheehan (1852–1913), Irish Catholic clergyman and author
P. A. Ó Síocháin (1905–1995), Irish journalist, lawyer, author, son of D. D. Sheehan
P. J. Sheehan (1933–2020), Irish politician
Patty Sheehan (born 1956), American golfer
Rhian Sheehan, New Zealand music composer and producer
Robert Sheehan (born 1988), Irish actor
Samantha Sheehan (born 1986), American artistic gymnast
Susan Sheehan (born 1937), Pulitzer Prize-winning American author, wife of Neil Sheehan
Thomas Sheehan (disambiguation), several people, including:
Tom Sheehan (1894–1982), American pitcher, scout and manager
Tom Sheehan (politician) (1891–1955), Australian politician
Thomas Sheehan (academic) (born 1941), American philosopher
Timothy P. Sheehan (1909–2000), American Congressman
Vincent Sheehan (disambiguation), several people
William F. Sheehan (1859–1917), American politician
Winfield R. Sheehan (1883–1945), American film producer and executive, Fox Studios chief of production 1927–1935

See also
O'Sheehan, an Irish clan originally from County Clare
Sheean (disambiguation)

Surnames of Irish origin
Anglicised Irish-language surnames